The Kingdom of Rishing was a petty kingdom in the confederation of 24 states known as Chaubisi Rajya. King of Tanahun, Hammar Sen, had controlled Rishing.

References 

Chaubisi Rajya
Former countries in South Asia
Rishing
History of Nepal
R